John Forsythe Ashby (March 26, 1929 – May 10, 2001) was an American bishop in the Episcopal Church.

Early life and education 
Ashby was born in Tulsa, Oklahoma, on March 26, 1929, son of Thomas Albert Ashby and Margaret Mote. He received a bachelor's degree in Psychology and Sociology from Oklahoma State University in 1952 and a master's degree in divinity from the Episcopal Theological Seminary of the Southwest in 1955. Between 1966 and 1967, he studied New Testament ethics as a member of Pembroke College, Cambridge in England and was awarded a Master of Arts in 1967. He was awarded a Doctor of Divinity from the Episcopal Theological Seminary of the Southwest in 1981. He married Mary Carver on August 12, 1954 and together had two children.

Ordained ministry 
Ashby was ordained priest in December 1955 and became vicar of St John's Church in Durant, Oklahoma and St Peter's Church in Coalgate, Oklahoma. In 1959 he became rector of St Luke's Church, in Ada, Oklahoma, where he remained until 1981. He was also a chaplain in the Oklahoma National Guard and held the rank of lieutenant colonel.

Bishop
On February 14, 1981, Ashby was elected on the sixth ballot as the second Bishop of Western Kansas during a special diocesan convention. He was then consecrated on May 21, 1981 at St. John's Military School in Salina, Kansas. He led the Episcopal Diocese of Western Kansas until his retirement in 1995. to 1995. In 1986, he travelled to Guam to serve as interim bishop of the Episcopal Church in Micronesia. In 1992, as an ecumenical gesture, he named a Roman Catholic priest an honorary canon. He retired in January 1995. He died in 2001.

References

External links 
 Episcopal Diocese Convention Set

1929 births
2001 deaths
Oklahoma State University alumni
20th-century American Episcopalians
Episcopal bishops of Western Kansas
20th-century American clergy